The Supreme Court of Mauritius is the highest court of Mauritius and is the final court of appeal in the Mauritian judicial system. It was established in its current form in 1850, replacing the Cour d'Appel established in 1808 during the French administration and has a permanent seat in Port Louis. There is a right of appeal from the Supreme Court of Mauritius directly to the Judicial Committee of the Privy Council in London. The Judicial Committee of the Privy Council (JCPC) is the court of final appeal for Mauritius.

On 30 July 2020, a new building housing the Supreme Court was inaugurated jointly by Indian Prime Minister Narendra Modi and Mauritian Prime Minister Pravind Jugnauth.

The chief justice is the head of the court and has precedence over any other judges in the republic. The chief justice is second in line (after the vice-president) to succeed the president in case of removal, death or resignation until a new president is elected. The chief justice is also fifth in the line of precedence following the president, prime minister, vice president and deputy prime minister. As from 2021, the current chief justice is Rehana Bibi Mungly-Gulbul, the first woman ever to occupy this position, having been appointed 18 November 2021, succeeding Ashraf Caunhye. The major divisions of the Supreme Court are Family Division, Commercial Division, Master's Court, Mediation Division, Criminal Division, Court of Civil Appeal and Court of Criminal Appeal. The Judicial Committee of the Privy Council is the final Court of appeal in Mauritius.

History
The modern system of law in Mauritius is an amalgamation of French civil law and common law, while the civil and criminal proceedings are modelled based on British practice. Supreme Court is established as the highest court of justice and lower courts of namely, the Criminal Court of Procedure and the Civil Court of Procedure. The official language used in the Supreme Court is English.

In 1507 Portuguese sailors came to the uninhabited island and established a visiting base. Diogo Fernandes Pereira, a Portuguese navigator, was the first European known to land in Mauritius. He named the island "Ilha do Cirne". The Portuguese did not stay long as they were not interested in these islands. In 1598 a Dutch squadron under Admiral Wybrand Van Warwyck landed at Grand Port and named the island "Mauritius" after Prince Maurice van Nassau of the Dutch Republic, the ruler of his country. France, which already controlled neighbouring Île Bourbon (now Réunion), took control of Mauritius in 1715 and renamed it Isle de France. From 1767 to 1810, except for a brief period during the French Revolution when the inhabitants set up a government virtually independent of France, the island was controlled by officials appointed by the French Government. A Penal Code was published in 1791 and adopted by the Colonial Assembly in 1793, while a separate civil code was promulgated on 3 September 1807. The Supreme Court was established as a supreme body composed of the Prime minister, President, three judges, four clerks and a government commissioner where appeal from neighbouring Seychelles was also allowed.

Despite winning the Battle of Grand Port, the only French naval victory over the British during these wars, the French could not prevent the British from landing at Cap Malheureux during 1810. They formally surrendered the island on the fifth day of the invasion, 3 December 1810, on terms allowing settlers to keep their land and property and to use the French language and law of France in criminal and civil matters. Under British rule, the island's name reverted to Mauritius. The British rule established a two tier system where the justice can have a higher appeal in Majesty's council. By 1851, after many changes in the judicial administration laws, Supreme Court was established as the body of appeal, making it again a single tiered jurisdiction. A bail court was later established with a judge of the Supreme court with a  right to appeal, making it a two-tiered system.

Composition
The Supreme Court has the Chief Justice, a Senior Puisne Judge and a number of Puisne Judges as prescribed by the Parliament of Mauritius. As of 2014, there were 17 Puisne judges. The Chief Justice is appointed by the President in consultation with the Prime Minister, the Senior Puisne Judge acting in accordance with the advice of Chief Justice and the Puisne Judges acting in accordance with the advice of the Judicial and Legal service Commission as listed in Section 77 of the Constitution. To qualify as a Chief Justice of the Supreme Court of Mauritius, a person has to be a practicing barrister for at least five years, a barrister entitled to practise before the Supreme Court as listed in Section 77(4) of the Constitution. A judge of the Supreme Court holds office until the retirement age of 62. A judge may be impeached for inability to perform the functions of his office or for misbehaviour. He shall be removed from office by the President under the advice of removal referred by the Judicial Committee deputed.

Jurisdiction

The Supreme Court has unlimited jurisdiction to hear and determine any civil or criminal proceedings under any law other than a disciplinary law and such jurisdiction and powers as may be conferred upon it by the Constitution or any other law. It is a superior court of record and the principal court of original civil and criminal jurisdictions. It exercises general powers of supervision over all District, Intermediate and Industrial Courts and other special courts.

The Supreme Court is also a Court of Equity vested with powers, authority, and jurisdiction to administer justice and to do all acts for the due execution of such equitable jurisdiction, in all cases where no legal remedy is provided by any enactment. Section 83 of the Constitution provides that the Supreme Court has original jurisdiction in the interpretation of the Constitution. It has the power and jurisdiction to hear and determine any complaint of a disciplinary nature in respect of the professional conduct of a law practitioner or a ministerial officer including a land surveyor. Moreover, the  Supreme  Court  has  exclusive  jurisdiction  in  matters  pertaining to  judicial  review  and  has  the  same  powers  as the  High  Court  in  England.

The Supreme Court has full power and jurisdiction to hear and determine all appeals, whether civil or criminal, made to the Court from: a judge in the exercise of his original jurisdiction, the Bankruptcy Division, the Master and Registrar, the Intermediate Court, the Industrial Court, a Magistrate, any other court or body established under any other enactment Appeals are heard before at least two judges.

Divisions of the Supreme Court
The Family Division of the Supreme Court was established in January 2008 and it administers all family related cases like divorce, judicial separation, alimony and maintenance or custody or guardianship of minors. The Commercial Division of the Supreme Court established in 2009 administers all cases related to companies, disputes, trademarks, exchange, offshore business and patents. The Master's Court administers legal heir provisions of Mauritan laws. The Mediation Division disposes all civil suit, action or cause of common agreement.
The Court of Civil Appeal is a division of the Supreme Court and is composed of the Judges of the Supreme Court presided by the Chief Justice or the Senior Puisne Judge. The Court of Criminal Appeal is a division of the Supreme Court and is duly constituted by three judges presided over by the Chief Justice or the Senior Puisne Judge. A person convicted before the Supreme Court may appeal under the Criminal Appeal Act against his conviction or sentence. The Judicial Council is the final court of appeal where questions on interpretation of constitution, dispute value is more than 10,000, final provisions of section 17 of Constitution and matters of public importance as directed by Supreme Court. The Supreme Court also administers all the Intermediate Courts, Industrial Court and District Courts.

The Master and Registrar is an officer of the Supreme Court and shall be a barrister of at least 5 years standing. His duties consist in the taxing of costs, to conduct and manage judicial sales, probate of wills and the matters connected therewith, interdictions and local examinations and to deal with matters of audit, inquiry, and accounts and generally, all such matters as may be referred to him by the Chief Justice or the Judges. The Master is assisted by a Deputy Master. The Secretary to the Chief Justice has a set of administrative and technical officers. The Chief Registrar has a set of Chief court officer and manager for each of the divisions and sections of the Supreme Court.

Statistics
As of 2014, a total of 8,594 cases were pending before the Supreme Court of Mauritius. The number of cases before the case decreased by 1 per cent in 2014 compared to 2013, while the number of cases disposed increased by 32 per cent. The number of criminal offences convicted before the Criminal Division of the Supreme Court increased by 8 per cent in 2014. There were three sodomy and twelve convictions in drug related cases in 2014.

Chief Justices of Mauritius

See also

 Judicial Committee of the Privy Council 
 Politics of Mauritius
 Constitution of Mauritius

Notes

References

External links 

Attorney General's Office
National Assembly

Law of Mauritius
Supreme Court
Government of Mauritius
Politics of Mauritius
Political organisations based in Mauritius
Mauritius
Government buildings in Mauritius